Gambit (Remy Etienne LeBeau) is a fictional character appearing in American comic books published by Marvel Comics, commonly in association with the X-Men. The character was created by writer Chris Claremont and artist Jim Lee. Drawn by artist Mike Collins, Gambit made his first appearances in The Uncanny X-Men Annual #14 (July 1990) and The Uncanny X-Men #266 (Aug. 1990). Gambit belongs to a subspecies of humans called mutants, who are born with superhuman abilities. Gambit has the ability to mentally create, control, and manipulate pure kinetic energy to his desire. He is also incredibly knowledgeable and skilled in card throwing, hand-to-hand combat, and the use of a bō staff. Gambit is known to charge playing cards and other objects with kinetic energy, using them as explosive projectiles.

He was part of a thieves' guild before becoming a member of the X-Men. Given his history, few X-Men trusted Gambit when he joined the group. There was consistently a source of stress between him and his on-again, off-again love interest and eventual wife Rogue. This was exacerbated when Gambit's connections to villain Mister Sinister were revealed, although some of his team members accept that Gambit honestly seeks redemption. Often portrayed as a "ladies' man," Gambit has shown a more vulnerable side of himself over the years, especially when it comes to Rogue. Gambit remains fiercely proud of his Louisiana heritage and speaks in a Cajun accent.

Since his debut, Gambit has appeared in several solo series. As of 2013, there have been three attempts at an ongoing title starring the character. Gambit has also had two miniseries and starred prominently in Gambit & the X-Ternals, the X-Force replacement title during the Age of Apocalypse. He has been featured in several animated series and video games based on the X-Men.

Gambit made his live-action debut in the 2009 film X-Men Origins: Wolverine, portrayed by Taylor Kitsch.

Publication history
Gambit was created by writer Chris Claremont and artist Jim Lee. The character was introduced in-story in The Uncanny X-Men #266 (Aug. 1990), which was written by Chris Claremont and drawn by Mike Collins. His next in-story appearance was intended to be in The Uncanny X-Men Annual #14 (July 1990), but that book was published three weeks early by mistake, before issue #266 was published. Because the story in the annual is set after the story in #266, there is some debate about which issue is the "true" first appearance of the character. Gambit joined the X-Men and appeared in almost every issue until The Uncanny X-Men #281 before moving to the X-Men title for a number of years. When Storm created a splinter group to hunt for Destiny's diaries in the pages of X-Treme X-Men, Gambit joined her in issue #5 and co-starred for the remainder of the series.

Gambit has starred or co-starred in four mini-series:

 Gambit Volume One (1993) and Gambit Volume Two (1997) explored the character's mysterious past and his ties to the New Orleans Thieves' Guild.
 Wolverine/Gambit: Victims (1995) teamed the two popular X-Men on a mystery involving what appears to be a modern-day Jack the Ripper.
 Gambit and Bishop (2001) was advertised as a sequel to the character's first series and involves the two X-Men in Stryfe's return.

Gambit has starred in three ongoing series. The first, which lasted 25 issues and two annuals, ran from February 1999 to February 2001. The second lasted 12 issues and ran from Nov. 2004 to Aug. 2005. The third series lasted 17 issues, from Aug. 2012 to Sept. 2013.

Additionally, Gambit & the X-Ternals, published in 1995, featured a group of renegade mutants led by Gambit who has been living on the edge of law during the "Age of Apocalypse" storyline. In 2009, Gambit's past was explored in the one-shot X-Men Origins: Gambit. In 2010, the one-shot "Curse of the Mutants: Storm & Gambit" was released. In June 2011, he began co-starring in X-Men: Legacy.

It was announced at the C2E2 convention by Marvel Comics that in August 2012 Gambit gets his own solo series that takes him back to his roots as a charismatic, cool, mutant master thief, written by James Asmus and drawn by Clay Mann. When asked about the upcoming series Asmus was quoted saying "This book focuses on the two most important aspects of Gambit: #1 that he's sexy, and #2 that he's the preeminent bad-ass thief of the Marvel Universe." Marvel canceled the series at issue #17.

Gambit was one of the principal characters in the 2013 series All-New X-Factor written by Peter David and drawn by Carmine Di Giandomenico. The series was cancelled after issue #20, with David suggesting it would be some time before Marvel would consider featuring Gambit in a leading role again due to a persistently low sales record in this and previous titles.

In October 2017, Gambit co-starred in his own comic with his love interest Rogue titled Rogue and Gambit, which was released in 2018.

Fictional character biography

Early life
Remy Etienne LeBeau was born in New Orleans, Louisiana. He was kidnapped from the hospital where he was born, then raised by the LeBeau Clan Thieves' Guild, and given to the Antiquary as a tribute.

They referred to the child as "Le Diable Blanc" ("the White Devil") and believed he was prophesied to unite the warring Thieves' and Assassins' Guilds. Soon after, Remy was placed in the care of Fagan's Mob, a gang of street thieves who raised the child and taught him the ways of thievery. After living as an orphan on the streets, a 10-year-old Remy attempted to pick the pocket of Jean-Luc LeBeau, then patriarch of the Thieves' Guild. Jean-Luc took the boy off the streets and adopted him into his own family.

Remy's bio-kinetic charging abilities manifested early in his teens, although he kept his powers secret from his family and friends, practicing his powers away from prying eyes. When he was 15, he accompanied his cousin Etienne Marceaux on his "Tithing," the ritual initiation test of the Thieves' Guild. However, it went awry as they were assigned to steal from the powerful immortal mutant Candra, who quickly captured them. Candra recognized Remy from an encounter that had taken place in her past but in his future (due to a time travel mission to the 19th Century that Remy would take as an adult) and sold them to the deformed mutant gangster and child slave trader known as the Pig, who planned to sell them and others their age to HYDRA as boy soldiers. Remy used his powers to escape their holding pen, but the physically enhanced Pig quickly caught up to them. Remy discovered his signature attack when he picked up a playing card that Etienne had dropped, charged it, and threw it in the Pig's face, taking out his eye. Finally escaping his clifftop headquarters by diving into the sea, Remy was ultimately rescued by the Guild; Etienne drowned.

Later during his teen years, Remy was first hired by Mister Sinister, then in the disguise of Dr. Nathaniel Essex. Essex wanted his stolen diaries back from the Weapon X program. Remy and the Thieves' Guild accepted the mission and sent out Remy to retrieve said diaries. Standing in the cold, scouting the Weapon X facility, Remy could not bear the cold and swore he would steal a long, stylish jacket in New Orleans after the mission, which he did. Upon entering the facility, Remy witnessed Wolverine escaping from his adamantium procedure and found the diaries. However, deeming them to be too dangerous for Essex to have them, as Remy did not fully trust him, Remy burned the diaries. He headed back home, only to find a disappointed Thieves' Guild and Essex.

In an attempt to reconcile the Thieves' and Assassins' Guilds, Remy married Bella Donna Boudreaux, granddaughter of the head Assassin, whom he met at the age of eight. Unfortunately, he was challenged by her brother Julien to a duel after the wedding. In the duel, Gambit killed Julien, and he was exiled from the city, ending his romantic relationship with Bella Donna.

The Mutant Massacre
After his exile from New Orleans, he wandered the world and became a master professional thief, making many contacts (and quite a few enemies). During this period, Gambit found he had an uncontrollable amount of energy flowing through him, to the point that he could not withstand it. Desperate, Gambit went to Mister Sinister for help. Sinister modified Gambit's power by removing a portion of Gambit's brain stem, making him significantly less powerful, but able to control the still considerably large amount of power in him. Years later, a much younger version of Mister Sinister surgically returned it, upon Gambit's request, when Gambit time-traveled to the 19th century.

However, Sinister wanted the favor returned, so Gambit carried out various missions for him. For the last of these operations, Gambit gathered together a group of mercenaries which Sinister named the Marauders. Mister Sinister then ordered Gambit to lead Sabretooth, Blockbuster, Prism, and Riptide into the tunnels under New York City — while unknown to Gambit however — Mister Sinister had also ordered Scalphunter, Arclight, Harpoon, Malice, Scrambler and Vertigo into the tunnels. The group of Scalphunter followed the Morlock Tommy and their goal was to wipe out the Morlocks. Gambit was unable to prevent the Marauders from killing a considerable number of Morlocks, but he was able to save a single child named Sarah, who would grow up to be Marrow, the leader of the mutant terrorist group Gene Nation. Gambit long kept his involvement with Mister Sinister and his mission in the massacre a secret from his fellow X-Men, much to their eventual displeasure.

X-Men
After wandering around the world, he encountered a de-aged and powerless Storm, and helped her escape from the Shadow King. He then rescued her from Nanny and the Orphan-Maker, helping her battle them. Afterwards, the young amnesiac Storm, who had reverted to thieving to stay alive, joined Gambit, and she eventually brought him back to the X-Men. Soon after, Gambit helped the X-Men, X-Factor, and New Mutants battle the Genoshans. Only Wolverine expressed his doubts about the Cajun, which led to a Danger Room duel between the two. Gambit was able to triumph by using a robotic doppelganger of Lady Deathstrike to distract Wolverine while taking advantage of Wolverine's injuries, inflicted by the Reavers. Gambit and the X-Men were then taken to the Shi'ar galaxy by Lila Cheney. Alongside the X-Men and Starjammers, Gambit battled Deathbird, the Imperial Guard, and a band of Warskrulls. Upon their return to Earth, Gambit assisted the X-Men and X-Factor in battling the Shadow King, though he was temporarily controlled by the Shadow King.

When the original five X-Men rejoined and the team was divided into two squads, Gambit became part of the Blue team under Cyclops' leadership. Alongside the X-Men, he battled Magneto and his newly formed Acolytes, Fenris, the Hand, Omega Red, and Sabretooth, and then Mojo. Gambit then fought Bishop and was attacked by his estranged wife Bella Donna. Gambit recounted how he had fled from New Orleans after killing his brother-in-law in self-defense. Alongside the X-Men, Gambit first encountered the second Ghost Rider. Gambit battled the Brood Queen and the Brood-possessed Ghost Rider, and witnessed the apparent death of his now ex-wife, Bella Donna.

Gambit became romantically interested in one of his teammates, Rogue, and started flirting with her. Despite her off-putting manner and the obstacle of her uncontrollable mutant ability that prevented anyone from touching her, he began romancing and seducing Rogue. Their strong romantic relationship was originally written as a one time, flirtatious moment; ironically, their romantic relationship is listed as one of the longest and most popular on-going deep and close romantic relationships in the X-Men series, probably only second to Jean Grey and Cyclops. Although their early "courtship" portrayed him as very "devil may care" in his flirtation with her, later issues revealed that, beneath his bravado and swagger, he truly had genuine romantic feelings for her. Similarly, despite her initial aggressive rejection of his advances, Rogue found that she was not only flattered by his attention but that she felt equally romantically attracted to him.

Many publishing years later, it had become apparent Remy had a dark secret. Sabretooth had hinted to it on numerous occasions during his "residency" at the X-Mansion, prompting Rogue to ask him to reveal whatever he knew about Gambit's past. Remy was captured and brought before a mock trial held by Magneto, the mutant Master of Magnetism, disguised as Erik the Red. Rogue was forced to kiss him again, revealing that he had gathered information on the Morlocks and assembled the team of Marauders for Mr. Sinister who did not inform Remy of his ultimate intent for the mutant tribe. When the Marauders later began killing most of the Morlocks, it was revealed that Gambit saved a single girl from the Marauders during the massacre. This apparent revelation and absorbing Gambit's own guilty memories caused Rogue to reject him. Gambit was similarly cast out of the X-Men and was abandoned in the frozen wastes of Antarctica.

Starving, and haunted by the betrayal of his lover, Gambit made his way back into Magneto's citadel, where he encountered the psionic essence of a dead mutant named Mary Purcell. The wraith-like Mary bonded with him, allowing him to survive until he reached the Savage Land, a hidden jungle nestled in the icy wasteland. There, Remy struck a deal with an enigmatic being known as the New Son. In exchange for passage back to America, Gambit agreed to run errands with the help of friend Jacob Gavin Jr. During this period, Remy's command over his abilities strengthened and amplified significantly.

When Gambit's psyche absorption had worn off, Rogue spent months searching for him, to no avail. Gambit encountered Storm and Shadowcat when he attempted to steal the fabled Crimson Gem of Cyttorak for his new employer. He agreed to return to the X-Men, mainly for his self-respect and for Rogue. At one point, he became the field leader of a branch of X-Men. His romantic love for Rogue was still intact, but her inability to control her powers made her break it off out of fear of hurting him.

Meanwhile, the New Son revealed his true identity as an alternate universe version of Gambit himself, after organizing an assassination game for a cadre of superpowered mercenaries with Remy as the target. During the final confrontation, Gambit burned out his enhanced abilities, thus returning to his original level of power.

Bishop's future
In Bishop's future timeline, Bishop stumbles upon a video from the past with Jean Grey making a frantic call to any X-Men she can find. She says that the X-Men have been betrayed by "one of their own" and it appears in the video that she is the last one left and is killed in the video. Disturbed by this, Bishop seeks "The Witness", a man who is said to be the last person who has ever seen the X-Men of the past alive. He enters a citadel of sorts where he confronts an old and withered but plucky man with long gray hair sitting on a throne, with two blonde women to either side of him. When Bishop confronts him as to who killed the X-Men the Witness acts as though he knows but refuses to tell and Bishop is thrown out of the citadel.

When Bishop comes to the X-Men in their original timeline, he meets Gambit and is sure that he is the same old man in Bishop's future and that it was Gambit who was the "Traitor" that killed the X-Men. For some time, he continues to watch Gambit's every step until he is finally convinced sometime later that Gambit was not the Traitor (with Onslaught being revealed to be the traitor). The reason behind Gambit being called the Witness in Bishop's timeline has not been revealed. In the Messiah Complex, it was revealed that the Witness was killed by the Marauders in their efforts to destroy anyone with knowledge of the future.

2000s

X-Treme X-Men: XSE
When Storm leads a team of X-Men in search of Destiny's diaries, the thirteen-volume Books of Truth, Gambit volunteered to join them, but Rogue — afraid that her increasingly uncontrolled powers would bring him harm — flatly refused to allow him along. He returned to thievery instead and was soon after framed by mutant businessman Sebastian Shaw for the death of the Australian crime lord named Viceroy. With the assistance of Rogue, Storm's team of X-Treme X-Men, and former Triad member Red Lotus, Gambit was able to clear his name. Soon after, Remy was captured and his powers were used to open a portal intended for an alien invasion of Earth led by the interdimensional warlord Khan.

The X-Treme team's enemy, the enhanced human named Vargas, used the invasion as a chance to attempt to kill more of Storm's team, particularly Rogue who was depicted by Destiny as slaying him. Rogue's attempt at rescuing and shielding Gambit got her stuck and Vargas used the opportunity to impale them both. Gambit was seriously wounded, but Beast's surgical skills and Rogue's pleading with Gambit on the astral plane, resulted in both surviving their ordeal. As they lost their mutant powers, they decided to sort out their romantic relationship by retiring from the X-Men temporarily and moving to California.

Although he is powerless, Gambit later joins Storm in infiltrating the US President's Texan ranch for obtaining information on a closed-group meeting proposing worldwide policies on mutants.

Rejoining the team
Gambit and Rogue rejoined the X-Men soon after Sage jump-started their powers, and they were placed on Havok's team. In their first mission back, Gambit was temporarily blinded by one of his energized cards that went off by his face. Rogue tried to console Gambit during his recovery, but their romantic relationship became strained once more as he became more and more frustrated with his blindness and their lack of touch after Rogue's powers returned. He started lashing out at Rogue, most of the time verbally. As a result, Rogue took some time away from Gambit. While he lost his vision, Gambit developed an ability to read his playing cards like they were tarot cards and he was able to predict the attack by the Brotherhood. A little while later, during Christmas celebrations, Rogue asked Sage to once again jumpstart Gambit's powers, in the process, healing his vision.

During the story arc with Golgotha, Gambit revealed some deep insecurities he had about his romantic relationship with Rogue, saying that "Maybe dis no-touching thing is getting to me... more den I thought". He also told Rogue that she should just get together with Logan, thinking that there was a hidden attraction between the two. As a result of the accusation, Logan kissed Rogue, but she broke it off before it caused any major damage. Gambit then began to realize what he was saying, questioning his romantic love for Rogue, but soon after began to suffer from hallucinations that he was fighting Mister Sinister. However, Rogue and Gambit soon realized that Golgotha made them say things they did not mean and before the final battle, they "kissed" through their spacesuit helmets.

Once back at the mansion, Gambit and Rogue moved into the same room to try rebuilding some intimacy and began telepathic therapy with Emma Frost.  They soon found out that with all the emotional baggage going on in their minds, they were still unable to make physical contact mentally. This would cause even more strain when the new student, Foxx, joins Gambit's team and attempts to seduce him.

Horseman of Apocalypse

Rogue's foster mother Mystique was displeased with Rogue's choice of lovers and infiltrated Xavier's Institute by shapeshifting into a student called Foxx. She joined Gambit's squad in an attempt to ruin his relationship with Rogue. After Gambit resisted her charms, Mystique reverted to her true form and then offered Gambit something significantly more difficult to refuse: she transformed into Rogue and offered Gambit a Rogue with whom he could have a physical relationship, claiming that she was only trying to help relieve the increasing frustrations between the two lovers; "... if one of you could have some physical release...". Rogue eventually discovered her mother's presence in the school and that Gambit knew she was there. Gambit denies that he slept with Mystique.

Upon the return of Apocalypse, Gambit submitted himself to the villain and was transformed into one of Apocalypse's Horsemen, Death. Gambit intended to infiltrate himself into Apocalypse's ranks in order to protect the X-Men from the Dark Lord's eventual betrayal, but he miscalculated, as the transformation process warped his mind as well as his body. After becoming Death, Gambit's hair turned white and his skin turned deep black. Despite having his mind and body twisted, Gambit retained a large portion of his former self, stating to Apocalypse, "I'm both Death and Gambit", and he also remembered his love for Rogue as he could not bring himself to kill her. Gambit and Sunfire then returned to the Xavier Institute to claim Polaris. Gambit, in an attempt to free all ties with his old self, tried to kill Rogue and would have been successful had it not been for Pulse neutralizing Gambit's powers.

After the X-Men defeated Apocalypse, Sunfire left with Gambit to help him clear Apocalypse's brainwashing and live as entirely new beings, only to then be approached by Mister Sinister.

Marauders 
Gambit returned to his original appearance and powers (presumably with the aid of Mr. Sinister) and reemerged as a member of the Marauders. On a mission for Mr. Sinister (involving obtaining knowledge of the future) Gambit and Sunfire encountered Cable on the recently evacuated island of Providence. Before the fight Gambit said, "I dropped that whole new look, wit' the help of a friend." He then asked Cable for use of his super-computer to answer a question referring to the phrase "one minute before dawn," which tied into the then-upcoming Messiah Complex storyline. As a result, Gambit and Sunfire attacked him eventually forcing Cable to activate a self-destruct sequence destroying the entire island. Gambit and Sunfire escaped empty-handed.

During the fight, Cable noted that Gambit's accent sounded 'forced' either for comic effect or perhaps to indicate that things may not be as 'back to normal' as they seem with Gambit. As Gambit returned to Mr. Sinister's base to discuss the next step of the plan, he reprimanded Mystique for shooting Rogue when they abducted her, being placated only by Mr. Sinister's assurance that Rogue was still needed and would survive. In a recent confrontation with Cannonball and Iceman, he seemed to sympathize with a beaten Cannonball. He interfered when Scalphunter was about to kill Cannonball by attacking Cannonball and by his actions he was able to save Cannonball from certain death. At the same time, he also destroyed Destiny's diaries, preventing Sinister and the Marauders from getting them.

Messiah Complex
During the 2007–2008 "Messiah Complex" storyline, Gambit is personally targeted by Wolverine during the X-Men's assault on Mister Sinister's Antarctic base. After being tortured by the Canadian mutant, Gambit reveals that Cable has the baby before Sinister manages to regain the advantage and drive the X-Men off with Gambit later revealed not to be harmed. Later, as Bishop attempts to kill the baby (after immobilizing Cable), Gambit and several of the Marauders quickly stop him with Gambit bringing a section of the ceiling down on Bishop. Knowing the X-Men will arrive in moments, the Marauders depart with the baby, but not before Gambit ponders what could make Bishop turn on the X-Men.

Tracking Gambit using Cerebro, the X-Men find that the Marauders' hideout was on Muir Island. However, what they did not know is that Gambit let them track him. It appears that Gambit, along with Mystique, has plans of their own for the newborn mutant as evidenced by his lack of surprise when he delivered the baby to Sinister, who then reveals himself to be Mystique as the real Sinister lies on the floor with shock etched into his face, and the fact that Mystique told Gambit that it is time for the next step.

A flashback sequence shows that Mystique used Rogue's intensified powers to kill Sinister. In the present, she explains that everything she and Gambit have done has led to this moment as foretold by Destiny. Mystique touches the baby's face to Rogue's in the hope of sacrificing the child to save her. After an energy burst Gambit snatches the baby, saying that Rogue would never want an innocent life used to save hers. However, the child was unharmed by Rogue's touch. Gambit gives the baby to Xavier and says he wishes to stay with Rogue. Shortly after, Rogue awakens and tries to kill Mystique. However, somehow the baby cures her of her intensified powers, as well as any psyches she had ever absorbed; this leaves her with the psyche of only one other individual: Mystique. She tells Gambit she needs time alone and if he still cares for her, he would not follow.

"Divided We Stand"

In the 2008 "Divided We Stand" storyline, Gambit, received news that the Assassins Guild of New Orleans was approached to kill Charles Xavier, goes to track Xavier down and save him from possible danger. He manages to head off Xavier's attackers, defeating them in short order before he is joined by Xavier himself. They determine who the Assassins were supposed to kill next from a list Gambit pulls from one of the goons, which includes Juggernaut, Sebastian Shaw, and Carter Ryking (Hazard). Xavier makes the connection between himself, Ryking, and Juggernaut, but is at a loss with Shaw. They go to see Ryking, who was being held in a mental institution, only to find out that he had just died of a brain hemorrhage the night before.

Gambit and Xavier then drive out to the Nuclear Research Facility at Alamogordo, the place where the fathers of Xavier, Juggernaut, and Ryking all worked at some point in their lives and is most likely where Mister Sinister was running his genetic operations on the X-gene. However, Xavier begins to suffer terrible headaches, and he and Gambit decide to wait it out in the desert for a few hours, where they are once again attacked by the Assassins Guild.

Charles Xavier is abducted and taken to the Almagordo facility, where it is revealed that the employer of the assassins was Amanda Mueller, the head of the Black Womb Project, a former lover and protégée of Mister Sinister (as well as direct ancestress of the Summers' line), who plans to use Charles to activate Sinister's Cronus machine, so as to be able to revive herself with Essex's own superpowered essence. Meanwhile, Gambit manages to defeat the rest of the assassins with the assistance of Sebastian Shaw, and they form a temporary alliance of convenience to destroy the Cronus machine, which threatens Shaw as well and rescue Xavier. They ultimately manage to succeed with a desperate last-minute life-or-death gamble when Gambit directly charges Shaw with biokinetic energy, giving him enough power to utterly shatter the otherwise indestructible machine.

He begins searching Australia for Rogue and is again in the company of Professor Xavier. Gambit, however, is unsure of this venture, mainly because of Rogue's request that she be left alone. He and Xavier both agreed that if Rogue did not wish for their help or presence, they would do as she wished and leave her be.

When Gambit and Xavier make it over the plains, they find a completely mismatched landscape. Fearing it is Rogue's doing, they go in and find various parts of Rogue's past being projected around them, including her fight against Nimrod and being captured and beaten at Genosha. Gambit finds it hard to control his emotions seeing Rogue in so much pain, but Xavier reminds him that none of it is real. While in the Genosha prison cells, Gambit and Xavier find the Shi'ar parts hunters and they are told what is happening. They discover that Danger is the one causing the projections and is using Rogue's input from Danger Room sessions. Xavier decides it is better to find Danger first, coming to the conclusion that Danger is trying to push Rogue to some sort of realization.

Eventually, Xavier, Gambit and a group of Shi'ar pirates managed to shut down Danger. However, the Professor reactivates her and she defeats the pirates in turn when they attack Gambit and Xavier. After this, it is revealed that Rogue's powers never truly developed past their initial "nascent" stage, which was the reason why her powers never functioned properly. The Professor, now aware of this fact, uses his telepathy to tear down the mental walls that kept Rogue's powers from developing as well as removing the mental echo of Mystique. Finally Rogue kisses Gambit, with no ill side effects, revealing that she is in control of her absorption power.

Utopia
Gambit along with Rogue and Danger decides to go to San Francisco in order to regroup with the other X-Men. On their way there they are intercepted by Pixie who teleports them into the city which is in a state of chaos due to the anti-mutant and pro-mutant movements. Cyclops sends all three out in order to locate several missing students and bring them home. Gambit locates Trance, Dragoness and Toad who are being pursued by H.A.M.M.E.R. agents. Ariel and Onyxx appear and take Trance away for safety.

Later on he encounters Erg and Avalanche who attacks Ares. Gambit intervenes only to end up being swatted aside by Ares. Danger and Rogue come to his aid which eventually leads to Rogue absorbing Ares's powers. Gambit then blasts him unconscious. Having for the moment absorbed some of Ares's power, Rogue easily dispatches a small group of H.A.M.M.E.R. agents and proceeds to steal their tank, along with Gambit and Danger, in order to find the rest of the students and Trance who did not make it back to base. Trance appears to be lost in the city and under the attack of Ms. Marvel from the Dark Avengers team. Gambit, Rogue and Danger team-up to defeat the powerful female warrior, and Rogue eventually manages to calm Trance down. Remy, Rogue, and Danger then depart back to the X-Men's base.

After the battle between the X-Men and the Dark Avengers is over, Cyclops orders Gambit to destroy the Omega Machine chair that Osborn had built to neutralize mutant powers. Gambit makes his way into the H.A.M.M.E.R. headquarters. There, he fights H.A.M.M.E.R.'s mutate guards Hijack and Input. Hijack is easily defeated, however, Input is another story. The input uses his telepathic abilities to enter Gambit's head and discovers there are still left-overs from Remy's "Death" persona. Death re-emerges and defeats Input, and absorbed him into a playing card, which turns black upon doing so. Afterward, Remy somehow returns to normal, with a smile on his face. Gambit then completes his mission, destroys the chair, and returns to the X-Men. When he made it back to Utopia, Gambit got angry at Cyclops for letting Rogue go up against the villain Emplate all alone. Remy tried to argue with Cyclops, but suddenly got trouble with mood swings and left the group. He changed back into his Death persona and remembered how Apocalypse told him he would never be the same after undergoing the changing process. Gambit managed to calm himself down and transform back to his normal self, but he is worried about his condition.

2010s
In the 2010 "X-Men: Second Coming" storyline, Gambit, along with Dazzler, Anole, Northstar, Cannonball, Pixie and Trance travel to Limbo to rescue Magik. Things go wrong when the ground starts to tremble and an army of monstrous demons attack the team. Dazzler calls upon Gambit for help during the attack, but Gambit sinks into the darkness, claiming "Remy's not home right now" leading the X-Men to be overwhelmed by the demons and Gambit transforming into his Death persona. As Death, Gambit was able to transform two of his teammates, Dazzler and Northstar, into beings like himself by hitting them with his charged cards. After battling Cannonball, Death-Gambit was stabbed by Magik and Pixie with their magical swords enabling Gambit to reassert control over his form once more.

In the 2010–2011 "Curse of the Mutants" storyline in the X-Men vol. 3, Gambit and Storm were called upon to help steal the decapitated body of Dracula in order for the X-Men to resurrect Dracula in their fight against his son, Xarus. He continues to appear as a member of the team as a regular of the series, and also co-stars with X-23 in her self-titled series. He saves her from a burning building after she has been sent away following the events of Second Coming. She decides to pursue a quest to further discover about her past when Gambit decides to follow along to keep an eye on her. After 17 issues of traveling the world together Gambit and X-23 part ways, as Gambit decides to stay at the newly built Jean Grey School for Higher Learning, while X-23 travels to the Avengers Academy.

In 2012, writer James Asmus had intended to re-imagine the character as bisexual, but "word came down we would not be redefining the character as such".

After the events of the Age of X, Gambit chooses not to wipe his memory. He admits the extent of his feelings to Rogue and tells her that he cannot tolerate her indecisiveness. He decides that they should be apart until she is willing to be with him for good. Gambit later joins the team of Legion, Rogue, Magneto, Frenzy, and Xavier, in search of Legion's lost personalities that would not cooperate with him after his troubles in the Age of X. Later on in the series, Gambit, Frenzy and Rogue travel to the Jean Grey High School of Higher Learning to become teachers and mentors of the school. Gambit's role at the school is as a senior staff member.

In Astonishing X-Men #48, Gambit becomes one of the principal members of a new team of X-Men, composed of Wolverine, Iceman, Northstar, Karma, Cecilia Reyes, and Warbird.

Gambit joins the newest incarnation of X-Factor. This version is a corporate superhero team sponsored by Serval Industries, which partners him with Polaris and Quicksilver.

Kitty Pryde sends Gambit and Rogue on an undercover mission to the island Paraiso. Their mission, as an estranged couple requiring relationship therapy, was to investigate the disappearance of mutants. This results not only in them confronting their past, emotions, and relationship challenges but also finding that their memories and powers (as well as those of the missing mutants) are drained into their clones by a mutant called Lavish. Although they are severely weak, they fight against Lavish and the clones, restoring their memories and powers. The couple later decides to learn from their past mistakes and reunite. A conversation with Storm and Nightcrawler spurs him into proposing to Rogue at Kitty's and Colossus' cancelled wedding and to take advantage of all their friends being present. They are married by the rabbi who was present for officiating Kitty's wedding, with Nightcrawler and Iceman as Rogue's bridal party and with Storm and X-23 as Gambit's best women.

While in space, their honeymoon is interrupted when they receive a message from Kitty Pryde about a secret package that they must find, however, the unknown package involves the Shi'ar Empire and several others are after it as well. They soon discover that the package is actually Xandra, who is the bio-engineered daughter of Xavier and Lilandra who can take any form at will. The newlyweds are soon caught by the Shi'ar but are able to free themselves, with the help of Cerise and the Starjammers they escape. Having read Rogue's mind, Xandra offers to fix her abilities so she can touch anyone, however, Rogue refuses, when Gambit questions her, she explains that the last time it happens, she never learned to control it herself. The ground is interrupted by the Imperial Guard and by Deathbird and a fight ensues. Realizing they're losing the fight, Xandra uses her abilities to make everything think she and Rogue were killed, after the Imperial Guard and Deathbird leave, they return, only to have Rogue's ability become uncontrollable as she can now absorb memories without touching anyone. Xandra explains that her powers have evolved, Rogue will have to learn to control it on her own, Gambit and Rogue return to Earth.

Gambit and Rogue receive a mysterious gift, when they open it they are teleported into the Mojoverse. Mojo resets their lives by putting them in a Noir setting, however, due to Rogue's abilities she becomes self-aware, her abilities become unstable and ends up killing Remy in the process. This forces Mojo to constantly reset their lives to Fantasy, Western, Horror, Romance, Sci-Fi and Comedy. During a reality talk show, Gambit walks off and into a bar where he meets a mysterious woman who turns out to be Spiral. She restores his memory and makes Gambit an offer that if he steals something for her she will help Rogue with her powers and help them escape. Spiral meets Rogue in her mind where she explains to her that until she became self-aware of what her abilities should be doing, Rogue was subconsciously controlling her powers.

Powers and abilities
Gambit is a mutant with the ability to convert the potential energy stored in an inanimate object into pure light kinetic energy, thus "charging" that item with highly explosive results. He prefers to charge smaller objects, such as his ever-present playing cards, as the time required to charge them is greatly reduced and they are much easier for him to throw. The only real limitation to this ability is the time required to charge the object: the larger it is the more time it takes to charge. Most charging takes place through direct skin contact. The power of his explosions is dependent on the mass of the object he is charging: for example, a charged playing card explodes with the force of a grenade. Gambit can also use his mutant abilities to accelerate an object's kinetic energy instead of converting its potential energy; for example, he can charge his Bo staff with enough kinetic energy and power to level a house.

Gambit's ability to tap into kinetic energy also grants him incredible superhuman physical attributes (strength, speed, reflexes and reactions, agility, flexibility, dexterity, coordination, balance, and endurance), as his body constantly generates bio-kinetic energy and so is perfectly constructed for constant motion. This gives him an added edge that he has used to his advantage by developing a unique acrobatic fighting style.

The charged potential energy always in his body grants him the ability to build up charges of static electricity, and shields his mind from detection and intrusion by even the strongest and most powerful telepaths such as Emma Frost, Jean Grey, and even Charles Xavier. The shield has the added effect of destabilizing touch-based abilities.

Gambit also possesses an unusually strong and irresistible hypnotic charm that allows him to exert a subtle influence over sentient beings, leading them to believe what he says and agree with his suggestions. This charm is so strong and powerful that if given a chance, Gambit could even charm the Shadow King himself. The hypnotic charm does not work on those who know about it.

During combat, Gambit customarily wears a suit of highly articulated light body armor and uses an extendable metal staff. He is extensively trained in martial arts, particularly Savate and the staff style art Bōjutsu. He is an excellent hand-to-hand combatant, applying street-fighting techniques and acrobatics. Gambit is a skilled card-thrower, so he throws his charged playing cards at opponents with great accuracy. He also excels in all aspects of thievery, as he was adopted by the patriarch of a Thieves Guild.

Gambit was temporarily given the full strength and potential of his mutant abilities to battle his counterpart, New Son. At his full strength and power, Gambit can control all aspects of kinetic energy down even to the molecular level, allowing him to manipulate the potency of his bio-kinetic energy to burn, cause molecular discomfort, incinerate, create timed detonations (and manipulate the potency of the energy release), fire energy blasts, defy gravity, heal wounds, charge objects within his line of sight without contact, manipulate the flow of time & space and effectively exist as an energy being. Under such conditions, he holds sufficient power to cause another being to be unable to move—or unable to stop if in motion. He has been able to cause or simulate various energies by manipulating the kinetic energy present, such as infrared and microwaves, by increasing molecular agitation, or cold by reducing it. He was also able to use his powers to travel through space-time, cross dimensions, and remake realities outside of space-time by transforming himself into living energy which joined with the kinetic flow. Finally, Gambit was able to heal himself by stimulating his cellular activity. These enhanced powers were burnt out after fighting New Son, and Gambit has since returned to his original, somewhat lower power levels.

However, after Sage jump-started his powers again, he was able to heal his blinded eyes. —thus implying he is again able to heal himself—and is also able again to charge living things with energy, as when he teamed up with Sebastian Shaw to destroy Mr. Sinister's machines. He was also given another boost when he was killed in an altercation with a drug lord and Faiza Hussain managed to restore him before it set in, enabling him to charge a bullet with twice as much explosive force than usual. He has later proven able to delay his explosions again, although this is difficult for him to accomplish.

After Apocalypse used the Celestial Technology to transform Gambit into the Horseman Death, Gambit demonstrates the ability to convert inert materials into toxic substances (such as transforming breathable air into poisonous gases) and has the potential to ingest diseases and plagues. It is apparent that the Celestial Technology never left his system, as seen during a telepathic attack against him that temporarily brought out the Death persona, which eventually killed the attacker. He also showcased new abilities he had not used before in this form – such as his Death Charge, which fueled his projectiles with dark energies that have the effect of either disintegrating or entrapping beings within his cards. His new transformation also affords him the ability to control the trajectory in which the thrown cards fly in, giving him more control over their vector path while in motion. He could also convert people to his mindset like he did with Northstar, Dazzler and several demons while in limbo. Gambit's body did subsequently return to normal, suggesting that Gambit now has the ability to switch between his own and Death appearances.

Reception

Critical reception 
Chris Killian of ComicBook.com referred to Gambit as one of the "best X-Men mutants," writing, "It’s really hard to have a “10 Best” X-Men mutants list and not include the Ragin’ Cajun. What’s not to love about the guy? He’s suave, wears a cool trench coat, and always flirts with Rogue even though he knows she’ll most likely drain him of his life force. Since first appearing in Uncanny X-Men #266, Gambit has consistently remained one of the more popular members of the team, yet he’s always floundered a bit on attempts to go out on his own. Even his rumored solo movie starring Channing Tatum can’t seem to get off the ground. But at least there have been attempts to bring him to the big screen. Is anyone trying to make a solo Strong Guy movie? Didn’t think so."

Scoot Allan of CBR.com stated, "After Gambit's first comic appearance in the 90s (it's slightly debated among collectors whether his debut came in Uncanny X-Men Annual #14 or Uncanny X-Men #266), the character quickly became one of the most popular members of the team whose mysterious origins were slowly explored over the last couple of decades. Surprisingly, despite Gambit's continuing popularity among fans, the character hasn't made the jump outside of comics as many times as his teammates, with just a bit more than a handful of animated and live-action adaptations. Since fans never got to see Gambit on the big screen alongside the X-Men."

IGN called Gambit one of the "greatest heroes to ever grace the pages of the funny books," asserting, "At some point it was decided that one mysterious badass loner wasn't enough for the X-Men, and Gambit arrived to back up Wolverine. For some, Gambit's presence on the team has always been redundant, but others have fallen in love with his swagger, charm, and dark past. Gambit is just the sort of tortured soul that X-readers love, and his continued presence in the TV and movie spinoffs cements his status as one of the greats."

Kayla Brown of Screen Rant said, "Remy LeBeau also known as Gambit, started as a member of the New Orleans Thieves Guild. Learning their villain-like ways he gains the reputation of a master thief. Using his power, he can change any inanimate object into an explosive device. Known to be mysterious and charming Gambit takes on the cool guy role of the team. Making bad decisions at one point in his life he changed his life around redeeming himself and joining the X-Men. Taking in his second chance he uses his protectiveness and patience to prove he has a good heart. Even though he is on the good side of the tracks now, he still has moments of frustration and can be a bit sarcastic. Being the good guy with bits of annoyances and stress makes him a relatable character to fans."

Accolades 
 In 2011, IGN ranked Gambit 65th in their "Top 100 Comic Book Heroes" list.
 In 2013, ComicsAlliance ranked Gambit 4th in their "50 Sexiest Male Characters in Comics" list.
 In 2015, Entertainment Weekly ranked Gambit 8th in their "Let's rank every X-Man ever" list.
 In 2017, ComicBook.com ranked Gambit 10th in their "10 Best X-Men" list.
 In 2018, CBR.com ranked Gambit 27th in their "Age Of Apocalypse: The 30 Strongest Characters In Marvel's Coolest Alternate World" list.
 In 2022, CBR.com ranked Gambit and Rogue 7th in their "10 Best Marvel Couples" list.
 In 2022, Screen Rant ranked Gambit 1st in their "10 Best X-Men Characters Created By Chris Claremont" list.

Literary reception

Volumes

X-Men: Curse of the Mutants - Storm & Gambit - 2010 
According to Diamond Comic Distributors, X-Men: Curse of the Mutants - Storm & Gambit #1 was the 55th best selling comic book in August 2010.

James Hunt of CBR.com called X-Men: Curse of the Mutants - Storm & Gambit #1 "remarkably good," asserting, "The issue sees Storm and Gambit -- characters with similar skill sets (if not powers) and a history of working together -- teaming up to steal Dracula's body from the heart of Vampire Island. It makes perfect sense to team this pair up, and strangely, this could have made for a reasonably satisfying issue of the main series, if only editorial were willing to break out of the fairly narrow idea of what an X-Men story has to be these days. [...] The big thing this book has going for it is that it is, far and away, the best thing to come out with the "Curse of the Mutants" name attached. In fact, it almost works well enough as a stand-alone piece to recommend buying even if you're not following the ongoing story. Give it a chance, and you might be surprised."

Rogue & Gambit - 2018 
According to Diamond Comic Distributors, Rogue & Gambit #1 was the 38th best selling comic book in January 2018. Rogue & Gambit #1 was the 478th best selling comic book in 2018.

CBR Staff of CBR.com called Rogue & Gambit #1 a "promising first issue," saying, "I know Rogue and Gambit are one of the canonical Big Romances of superhero comics, but I couldn’t say for sure that I’ve ever actually read a comic with the two of them together as a couple. Not that this presents any real barrier to reading Rogue & Gambit #1. The issue does a great job of positioning them and their relationship in simple, understandable terms. [...] Given it’s a story about a couple reconnecting, or failing to, a little awkwardness between the two leads is actually quite appropriate. Whether the art is able to turn up the heat -- and indeed whether the developing relationship of Rogue and Gambit will require it to -- remains to be seen, but this first issue certainly has me crossing my fingers." Joshua Davison of Bleeding Cool stated, "Rogue and Gambit #1 is an entertaining comic, and I do get what fellow reviewer Joe Glass sees in it. However, it tries to have its cake and eat it too. It's not action-heavy enough to feel like a good superhero tale, but it's not calm enough to shoot for slice-of-life. While comics like Hawkeye, Astonishing Ant-Man, and Spider Woman have managed to make that balance work in the past, this one doesn't. If you really do like these two X-Men as a couple, then you should definitely check it out. It will likely give you exactly what you want. However, if you're looking to be sold on them as a couple, then, like myself, you probably won't get much out of it."

Mr. & Mrs. X - 2018
According to Diamond Comic Distributors, Mr. & Mrs. X #1 was the 15th best selling comic book in July 2018. Mr. & Mrs. X #1 was the 141st best selling comic book in 2018.

Jamie Lovett of ComicBook.com asserted, "In a very real way, Thompson, Bazaldua, and D'Armata have with Mr. and Mrs. X #1 delivered the comic book that many fans have been waiting their entire comics-reading lives to read. People have been following Rogue and Gambit's ups and downs for decades waiting for a series that does the couple justice by celebrating their love rather than leaning on their heartbreak. With Thompson's delightful dialogue and characterizations, Bazaldua's balance of the intimate and the exciting, and D'Armata's tone-setting, Mr. and Mrs. X seems set to deliver equal parts overdue emotional payoff and endearing adventure." Joshua Davison of Bleeding Cool said, "Gambit and Rogue are frigging adorable in this and seeing the excited assistance from the likes of Storm, Jubilee, Bishop, and a mystery guest I won't spoil makes this comic click so well. [...] Mr. and Mrs. X (not crazy about that name, though) #1 is a delightfully upbeat comic that brings an endearing and dare-I-say heartwarming wedding issue (that Batman #50 cheated me on and dammit I'm still so mad) between two classic and charming X-Men characters. The dialogue is great, the story is fun, and the artwork is great. This one earns a recommendation. Give it a read."

Other versions

Age of Apocalypse
In the Age of Apocalypse, Gambit was a member of the X-Men and one of Magneto's closest friends. Like his Earth-616 counterpart, Gambit too fell in love with Rogue, which prompted him to leave the X-Men when Rogue chose Magneto, whom she could touch due to the two possessing magnetism-based powers (she had permanently absorbed the powers and memories of Polaris just as she had done to Ms. Marvel on Earth-616). Gambit, as a member of the Thieves Guild, maintained a certain connection with Candra, who was also one of the Horsemen of Apocalypse, until she was killed. Despite having left the X-Men, Gambit still fought for "the Dream" in his own way. He assembled a group of thieves which he named "X-Ternals", who stole from Apocalypse's regime and the mutant aristocracy to provide food and medicines to the humans still living in New York. He also had an affair with Lila Cheney, despite the fact that he had not gotten over Rogue.

When Magneto put into action his plan to save Charles Xavier, Gambit agreed to steal a shard of the M'Kraan Crystal with the aid of his X-Ternals. Gambit and the X-Ternals were chased by Mudir Rictor and later faced the Shi'ar. However, Gambit obtained the shard of the Crystal, giving up in exchange for it his undying love for Rogue. Gambit thought that he had now lost his ability to love. The group returned to Earth; however, Gambit lost both the Crystal shard and Magneto and Rogue's son, Charles, to the traitor Guido when he threatened to kill Lila.

Despite this, Gambit was accepted back into the X-Men when they launched a mission to get into Apocalypse's citadel to rescue Magneto and put his plan into action. Gambit killed the crazed Colossus when his desire to save his sister Illyana threatened the mission.

Following the death of Apocalypse and the fall of his regime, Gambit once again became a member of the X-Men.

During the AoA's 10th anniversary, Gambit was part of the X-Men and helped Magneto eliminate the remaining forces still loyal to Apocalypse. This included helping the X-Men get rid of the Hellions. Magneto later became injured while telling the Morlocks that they were free, and when he was recuperating, Quicksilver detected mutant signatures of Apocalypse's former soldiers in Mexico. Magneto then left with Quicksilver, Gambit, and Sunfire.

The Guthrie siblings later attacked the X-Men's base, taking Rogue and Charles Lensherr captive. Magneto, Sunfire, Gambit, and Quicksilver returned to the base and defeated the Guthries. Magneto then revealed his secret regarding Sinister, leading the X-Men to Sinister's lab in New York. The X-Men then fought the Sinister Six, and during the fight, Gambit, Nightcrawler, and Dazzler were sucked into Cloak. Nightcrawler managed to save Dazzler, but not Gambit, resulting in Gambit's presumed death, though it was not confirmed. The X-Men later buried their dead and created a tombstone for Gambit whose full text is not seen, but ending in "... luck always be on his side."

However, it appears that luck was indeed at Gambit's side after all, as he was rescued in time from the Darkforce Dimension at some point and was greeted by the X-Men team later. When the X-Force team of Earth-616 came to the Age of Apocalypse to retrieve a Celestial life seed to prevent Warren to ascend as the new Apocalypse, Gambit was part of the Fantomex team to retrieve the seed from the deceased Celestial and he gives his life so the team could retrieve the object from the cosmic being.

Bishop's future
In the future timeline that is the home of the X-Man Bishop (Earth-1191), the X-Men were wiped out in 1996 by someone recorded only as 'The X-Traitor'. However, there was apparently one survivor of the attack, a man called "The Witness." He had a Cajun accent and long hair. He and Bishop had an antagonistic relationship at that time. When Bishop came to the past, he recognized Gambit's face as that of the Witness.

Later, the Witness was revealed to have been living happily in New Orleans, unchanged from how Bishop will know him in 80 years' time. He met the young Remy Lebeau, and had a set of trophies from countless battles across time (fans noticed Captain America's shattered shield, the red power suit from The Greatest American Hero, and Hellboy's Right Hand of Doom). He claimed to be pantemporal, capable of seeing all things in all realities at all times. The fact that he was even capable of conversing with Bishop or anyone else in a linear fashion is apparently due to his sense of humor.

Exiles

In Exiles, Gambit of Earth-371 was the team leader of Weapon X (the ruthless counterpart to the heroic Exiles), having replaced Sabretooth. With Weapon X they had to work with Iron Man, the fascist monarch of Earth, to kill all of the Inhumans. They succeeded and went to the next reality.

It appeared that he and Storm on his team had been in a relationship and that back in his alternative reality he and Storm (another one from his alternative reality) were married. Storm was now dead and replaced by Hyperion. In this mission, Weapon X was supposed to kill the ten remaining mutants in this reality, but this evil version of Hyperion wanted to be the ruler of this Earth. The heroes did not want to murder anyone, but a battle with Hyperion soon followed. Hyperion shot off Gambit's arm, forcing Gambit to retreat into the Morlock tunnels. Hyperion murdered most of the Weapon X team.

Finally, the Exiles appeared and determined the true nature of the mission although they initially refused to go through with it. They were to kill six members of Weapon X and the Exiles. Hyperion and an evil version of Ms. Marvel (who had already taken care of most of the killing) forced them to fight. In the end, Hyperion was seemingly killed by Gambit after Blink had injured him sufficiently to make him vulnerable. Gambit was disintegrated in the blast. It was revealed later that Hyperion resurrected himself and took control of the Panoptichron. It was also revealed that every Weapon X and Exiles team member who died or was sent home were frozen into a crystal wall in that palace. When the Exiles found the place, there were many fallen heroes—-Gambit among them. Gambit's body is returned to his home dimension for burial in.

New Exiles
In New Exiles #2-4, a very different version of Gambit was shown. Still called Remy, attracted to Rogue and sometimes speaking approximate Cajun, this version was the son of Namor and Sue Storm. He has four siblings and the power to breathe underwater as well as the force field projection capabilities of his mother. He saved Rogue when she was injured and drowning to her death. He was then flown by her to his family, which they saved together. He then went on to join the Exiles team.

House of M
Gambit makes a brief appearance in House of M as a thief being caught by Carol Danvers.

Marvel Zombies
A zombie Gambit is seen as one of the dozens of super-powered zombies attacking Doctor Doom's castle trying to reach the uninfected humans inside. This is after being seen on S.H.I.E.L.D.'s helicarrier between Colossus and Magneto. This takes place in Marvel Zombies vs. The Army of Darkness. In Marvel Zombies #3, Gambit is one of the many zombies trying to slay and eat the Silver Surfer. Next, Gambit's chest is blasted through, then his head, from the jaw up, is knocked off, by the cosmically powered zombies.

Mutant X
In the Mutant X universe, Gambit was in a fatal accident when he was attempting to save his foster daughter.

He was accompanied by Bloodstorm at the time and begged her to turn him into a vampire so that he didn't have to die. She reluctantly accepted his request and became Gambit's sire. He was very unhappy with the creature he had become, blaming Bloodstorm for what she had done to him, and ran away.

Since his eyes were naturally red, no one in the Thieves' Guild noticed any difference in Gambit, only making it easier for him to continue to feed. For a time, Gambit worked to prevent Bloodstorm from feeding on sentient beings, such as the thieving Marauders and otherwise innocent vampire-wannabes. Later, Gambit was forced to join Havok's team The Six, and while there, received a partial cure for his vampirism from the Brute. With the serum he devised, it granted both Gambit and Bloodstorm a reprieve from their blood lust and gave them the ability to walk in the sunlight. However, Gambit's appreciation did not run deep. When the team was in crisis-fighting the combined might of the Goblyn Force, Count Dracula, and the Beyonder, Gambit stole the team's jet and flew away with his adopted daughter Raven, never to be seen again.

New Son (Sun)
Appearing in the 1999 Gambit solo run, Gambit is called New Son (Sun) (X-Cutioner II) in Earth-9923 reality. In his own reality, the New Sun's kinetic charging powers had flared out of control, burning the world and killing everyone. As a result, the New Sun hunted down and killed versions of himself in other realities to ensure that they would not repeat his mistakes. New Sun is not limited to inorganic matter and can convert matter into energy at a sub-molecular level so it vaporizes or explodes. He also has the ability to time travel, can propel himself by a wave-like aura and can transplant matter through time and space, as well as being able to biokinetically augment all his physical abilities to superhuman levels.

In this reality, New Sun was never adopted by the Thieves Guild, so his real name is not "Remy LeBeau". New Sun was raised with his full power and intended to become the fulfillment of an ancient Guild prophecy to create Heaven on Earth. However, things went wrong when he charged up his power in a special ritual—a chain reaction was started that caused everyone on Earth beside himself to burn up. Failing to remake time, the New Sun traveled to other universes, hoping to prevent the same thing from happening there. However, he found many worlds in ruins, often because of that world's version of Gambit. Coming to the main Marvel Universe (616), he first attempted to create a new world where everyone would eventually be transported to, using the main reality's Gambit to help (without revealing to him who he truly was). When he learned that his plan wasn't possible, he tried to kill Gambit, transporting both of them to his destroyed homeworld before Gambit became a threat to the main universe's Earth world as well.

During their final conflict, Gambit finally blasted the New Sun, burning out his recently increased powers, just as the New Sun died. Due to New Sun's immense power, it is speculated that New Sun was an omega-level mutant in his home dimension, and likely mutant alpha on Earth-9923; this, however, cannot be confirmed.

Ultimate Marvel
In this universe, Remy LeBeau is a Cajun thief, similar to the normal mainstream version. A flashback shows that Remy was beaten maliciously by his father.

He was subsequently brought up by a thief who taught him the arts of stealing. His connection to Sinister has been hinted, but yet to be made clear, though it is noticeable that in flashbacks his father has red eyes like Mr. Sinister. When he confronted Hammerhead, the latter mentioned Sinister while bantering with Gambit. Later as an adult, Remy lived on the streets of New York, performing card tricks with his "magic", and he continued to steal. It also shows he has trouble controlling his powers wherein Ultimate X-Men #14, where he states to the mobsters he just defeated that he is a mutant but struggles with controlling his powers. He also does not have his bo staff at this time.

At one point, Charles Xavier offered Gambit the chance to join the X-Men, but he refused. While trying to save a young girl's life, Gambit also faced Hammerhead and defeated him by making the mobster's adamantium skull explode.

At some point Gambit met scouts in New Orleans who represented Andreas and Andrea Von Strucker, the Fenris Twins. The twins were presidents of Fenris International and secretly mutants. Their goal was to obtain mutant supremacy through economic empowerment. To accomplish this, they needed to find out the secrets of their business rivals. The twins made Gambit an offer that he could not refuse to participate in espionage activities. In addition to paying him, they cleaned up his accent and helped him control his powers.

Gambit ran into the X-Men again at the Coney Island Fair where he was sent by the Fenris Twins to recruit Rogue. To accomplish this Gambit had to get her alone and away from the X-Men team. He accomplished this by defeating the entire team by playing to their desire to avoid any bystander injuries.

He collapsed a giant Ferris wheel (i.e., the Wonder Wheel) taking much of the team out of the equation (knowing that they would go to rescue the people on the ride) and defeated Wolverine by threatening to explode Wolverine's skeleton, which would destroy a large part of the near area. He then proceeded to explode his bo staff in Wolverine's mouth, thus giving him enough time to take Rogue. The Fenris Twins felt Rogue would be an ideal employee since her powers (which include viewing others’ memories) would be useful for learning others' secrets. However, because of the unethical aspect of the job, Rogue refused. In response to seeing the fury of the twins, Gambit assisted Rogue in subduing the twins and escaping. As Rogue and Gambit escape, an enraged Wolverine finally tracks them down, beating Gambit badly with only his fists, preventing Gambit from making contact with his skeleton. Rogue stops Wolverine from killing Gambit and called him the true animal in this situation. Afterward, Gambit asked Rogue to come with him, commenting on how she and he were both alike. Rogue agreed and left the X-Men with him.

In a battle with Juggernaut, Gambit appeared to suffer fatal injuries. As Rogue gave him a last kiss, she completely absorbed his powers and memory, killing him and getting control over her ability to siphon the memories and abilities of others. As of Ultimate X-Men Annual #2, Gambit's powers have faded from Rogue.

X-Men: The End
In this version, he is married to Rogue, and they have two children, a son (Olivier) and a daughter (Rebecca "Becca").

In the miniseries X-Men: The End: Heroes and Martyrs, Gambit was revealed to be the clone of Mister Sinister, created from Sinister's own pre-mutated DNA. Sinister wished to destroy his master, Apocalypse, and to do so he needed a body that had not been subject to Apocalypse's altering. He then engineered mutant powers for the clone, using the DNA of Cyclops. This technically makes him the third Summers brother; in that alternative reality. However, Apocalypse learned of Sinister's plan and had the child stolen and left it in the care of the Thieves Guild.

It was originally believed that Gambit died in the series The End disguised as Sinister and trying to defeat the Shi'ar. However, in GeNEXT, a series about the children of the X-Men, Olivier talks about how he and his father (Gambit) have not really made contact since his mother (Rogue) died and that Gambit didn't have the heart to continue on as an X-Man. They only communicate through Rebecca.

Age of X
In the Age of X timeline, Gambit feels, for reasons unknown, compelled to rescue Rogue, who was being hunted by Moonstar and her team. They are seemingly killed by Magneto, but are later commissioned by him to break into a secret chamber.

X-Men Noir
In X-Men Noir, Remy LeBeau is depicted as the owner of the Creole Club, a nightclub and casino, also acting as an information source for his friend Thomas Calloway, a costumed detective and reporter for the Daily Bugle calling himself The Angel. He is, however, shown as an unscrupulous person, as he is not above collecting on debts with force.

X-Men: Forever
In X-Men: Forever he is referred to as Remy Picard.

Old Man Logan
In the "Old Man Logan" storyline, Gambit is among the X-Men who perish at the hands of Wolverine when he is tricked by Mysterio into believing his friends are super-villains attacking the mansion.

Marvel Zombies: Resurrection
Although Gambit is dead in this reality, Valerie Richards uses a hand taken from his corpse to destroy the source of the current zombie plague in the form of the Brood-infested Galactus.

In other media

Gambit made numerous animated appearances in cartoons such as X-Men, X-Men: Evolution and Wolverine and the X-Men. The character was portrayed by Taylor Kitsch in the live action X-Men Origins: Wolverine (2009). A Gambit spin-off was in development since at least May 2014, with Channing Tatum signed on to play the lead role. After five years of being stuck in development hell, the film was cancelled in May 2019.

Collected editions

Mini-series

Third series

Fourth series

Fifth series

X-Men: The Trial of Gambit

Mr. & Mrs. X

References

External links

 
 
 Spotlight on Gambit at UncannyXmen.net
 GambitGuild.com / LeBeau Library

Characters created by Chris Claremont
Characters created by Jim Lee
Comics characters introduced in 1990
Fictional bojutsuka
Fictional Cajuns
Fictional characters from New Orleans
Fictional characters with energy-manipulation abilities
Fictional characters with healing abilities
Fictional mercenaries in comics
Fictional professional thieves
Fictional savateurs
Male characters in film
Marvel Comics characters who can move at superhuman speeds
Marvel Comics characters who have mental powers
Marvel Comics characters with superhuman strength
Marvel Comics film characters
Marvel Comics male superheroes
Marvel Comics martial artists
Marvel Comics mutants
Superheroes who are adopted
X-Factor (comics)
X-Men members